Community Youth Development (CYD) is a philosophy emphasizing the symbiotic nature of youth development to community development by situating the two practices in a common framework. CYD combines the natural instincts of young people as they desire to create change in their environments by developing partnerships between youth-related organizations and community development agencies to create new opportunities for youth to serve their communities while developing their personal abilities.

See also

 Oaktree

External links

 Community Youth Development Journal Published by the Institute for Just Communities (IJC) and the Institute for Sustainable Development, Heller School of Social Policy and Management, Brandeis University.
 Community Youth Development: Programs, Policies, and Practices A resource publication.
 CommonAction An international CYD resource, training, and technical assistance organization.
 YoMo - support and resources for young peoples community participation.
 Youth Outreach Team - City of Vancouver's method of involving youth in civic decisions.
 Learning for a Cause, a non-profit educational organization founded by educator and writer Michael Ernest Sweet.
Community Youth Development at Nazareth College
 

 
Youth work